The 2014 Lamar Cardinals football team represented Lamar University in the 2014 NCAA Division I FCS football season. The Cardinals were led by fifth-year head coach Ray Woodard and played their home games at Provost Umphrey Stadium. They are a member of the Southland Conference.  The Cardinals finished the season 8–4, 5–3 in Southland play to finish in a three-way tie for third place. The eight win overall and five win conference record matched the Cardinals' best overall win record in both categories as a four year program.

TV and radio media
All Lamar games were broadcast on KLVI, also known as News Talk 560.

Live video of all home games (except those broadcast via the Southland Conference Television Network, SEC Network, or ESPN3) was streamed by Lamar University's Big Red Sports Network .

Before the season

2014 recruits
Lamar signed 17 players on national letter of intent day. Recruits are listed in the "Class of 2014 Signees" table below. Player profiles for each recruit are available at the signing day link below.  The 2014 recruits included 10 players from high school and 7 transfers.  Breaking down the transfers, two players transferred from NCAA Division I (FBS) programs. The remainder transferred from Junior College/Community College programs.

Signing Day Link:

Class of 2014 signees

4th Crawfish Bowl
The 4th Annual Red-White Crawfish Bowl was held Saturday, March 1. The game was modified from previous years.  While the team was divided into Red and White teams as in previous years, the game pitted offense against defense.  The White team consisted of offensive players while the Red team was made up of defensive players.  Scoring was adjusted to include normal scoring for the offense with the addition of additional points for scoring plays longer than 20 yards.  The defense scored on turnovers, three-and-outs, and stops.  The White team (offensive players) won 50–18 with the modified scoring.

Preseason Honors
Four Lamar Cardinals were selected to the pre-season all Southland Conference team.  Reggie Begelton, WR (JR) was selected to the First-Team Offense.  Kevin Johnson, PR (SR) was selected to the First-Team Defense.  Caleb Berry, QB (SR) and Justin Brock, OL (JR) were named to the Second-Team Offense.

The following Cardinals were named to national award watch lists.
Caleb Berry - CFPA Quarterback Watch List
Kade Harrington - CFPA Running Back Watch List
Mark Roberts - CFPA Receiver Watch List
Reggie Begelton - CFPA Receiver Watch List
Alex Ball - CFPA Kicker Watch List
Kevin Johnson - CFPA Kickoff Return Watch List, CFPA Punt Return Watch List, and the CFPA All-Purpose Performer of the Year Watch List.

Kevin Johnson was also named to the College Sports Madness Preseason All-American and the Beyond Sports Network Preseason All-American teams.

Postseason honors

AP All-American

 Mark Roberts - AP All-American 3rd Team (FCS)
 Mark Roberts - Sports Network All-American 3rd Team (FCS)

Southland Conference honors
Source: 
Mark Roberts - First team All Southland Conference
Caleb Berry - Second team All Southland Conference
Reggie Begelton - Second team All Southland Conference
Omar Tebo = Second team All Southland Conference
Xavier Bethany - Second team All Southland Conference

College Sports Madness honors
Source:  
Mark Roberts - First team All Southland Conference
Caleb Berry - Second team All Southland Conference
Reggie Begelton - Second team All Southland Conference
Ronnie Jones - Second team All Southland Conference
Bret Treadway - Third team All Southland Conference
Joe Okafor - Third team All Southland Conference
Omar Tebo - Third team All Southland Conference
Xavier Bethany - Third team All Southland Conference

Roster

Depth chart
Source:

Schedule

Game summaries

Grambling State

Sources:

Caleb Berry set the all-time Lamar Cardinals passing touchdown record on his third touchdown pass of the game against the Grambling State Tigers.

# 9 (FBS) Texas A&M

Sources:

The Cardinals and the 9th ranked Aggies played in front of a record setting crowd at Kyle Field.  The crowd of 104,728 set the record for the largest attendance in recently renovated Kyle Field and for a collegiate game in the state of Texas.  The game was delayed 2:05 hours because of lightning.

Texas College

Sources:

Mississippi College

Sources:

Sam Houston State

Sources:

Abilene Christian

Sources:

Southeastern Louisiana

Sources:

The game was close going into the fourth (4th) quarter with Southeastern Louisiana holding a one touchdown lead.  The fourth quarter was a different story with the Lions running away scoring four touchdowns for 27 points to the Cardinals' one touchdown in the quarter.

Nicholls State

Sources:

Caleb Berry broke three team marks becoming the Cardinals' all-time leader in completions, yards of total offense, and passing yards.  Lamar set a school record of 691 total yards in the game.

Houston Baptist

Sources:

With his four touchdown pass catches in the game, Mark Roberts set a new school record of nineteen (19) career TD catches.  Roberts also tied a school record of 24 points scored in a game.

Central Arkansas

Sources:

Incarnate Word

Sources:

McNeese State

Sources:

References

Lamar
Lamar Cardinals football seasons
Lamar Cardinals football